Sobral – O Homem que Não Tinha Preço is a 2013 Brazilian documentary film directed by Paula Fiuza about the jurist Sobral Pinto, who faced the dictatorship in Brazil and became one of the greatest defenders of human rights in the country's history.

References

Brazilian biographical films
Brazilian documentary films
Documentary films about lawyers
2013 films
Films about Brazilian military dictatorship
Documentary films about Latin American military dictatorships
2010s biographical films
2013 documentary films
2010s Portuguese-language films